Galina Lighthouse is a strongly tapered white concrete tower  high with no lantern. A solar-powered lens is mounted on a small platform at the top. It shows a white light flashing once every twelve seconds for a duration of 1.2 seconds followed by 10.8 seconds of darkness. The lighthouse is solar powered.

The station was established in 1912 but the tower's date of construction is unknown.

It is maintained by the Port Authority of Jamaica, an agency of the Ministry of Transport and Works.

See also

 List of lighthouses in Jamaica

References

External links
 Aerial view.
 Photos:  .

Lighthouses in Jamaica
Buildings and structures in Saint Mary Parish, Jamaica
Lighthouses completed in 1912